Pooja Vaidyanath is an Indian playback singer who has worked in the Indian film industry. After appearing on several reality singing shows on Tamil and Telugu television, Pooja has worked on Tamil, Telugu and Hindi language films for musicians including A. R. Rahman, D. Imman and S. Thaman.

Career
Pooja was born to doctor Vaidyanath and Gita, a bank employee in Chennai. After becoming interested in Carnatic and Hindustani music as a child, Pooja regularly took part in singing talent shows and first partook and won in the Telugu show Padalani Undi hosted by S. P. Balasubrahmanyam on Maa TV in 2006. She later competed in the Zee Telegu Sa Re Ga Ma Pa Voice of Youth in which she was crowned runner-up in 2008, before also winning the Vaanampadi competition broadcast in 2010 on Tamil language channel Kalaignar TV. In 2011, she finished as a runner up in Airtel Super Singer 3 and the opportunity brought her offers from the film industry. Pooja worked with A. R. Rahman in his Hindi film Raanjhanaa and recorded for the song "Tum Tak", which a critic from Filmfare described as a "winner". Rahman subsequently recorded the song again with her in Tamil as well as the tune "Kaanavae" for the film's Tamil version, Ambikapathy.

Pooja has subsequently continued to sing popular songs in Tamil films including "Parkadhey" from Varuthapadatha Valibar Sangam (2013), "Yeppo Maama Treatu" from Jilla (2014) and "Aalaporan Tamizhan" from A. R. Rahman's Mersal (2017).

Notable discography

References

External links

As Featuring Independent Music 
{| class="wikitable sortable"
|-
! style="background:#B0C4DE;" | Year
! style="background:#B0C4DE;" | Song
! style="background:#B0C4DE;" | Composer
! style="background:#B0C4DE;" | Lyrics
! style="background:#B0C4DE;" | Singers
! style="background:#B0C4DE;" | Notes
|-
| 2014 || Munney Vaa Daa  (Student Anthem) || Rap Rakesh Sethulingam || Rap Rakesh Sethulingam || Rap Rakesh Sethulingam, Pooja Vaidyanath, Saisharan, Nithyashree || Music Video Released by Drums Sivamani, Esq.RaviChandran & Ishari K. Ganesh
|-
| 2016 || Aalaabanaa  || Diron Fernando || Vairabharathi ||Pooja Vaidyanath, Krish Manoj ||   
|-

Living people
Indian women playback singers
Tamil playback singers
Kannada playback singers
Telugu playback singers
Tamil singers
1988 births
Women musicians from Andhra Pradesh
21st-century Indian singers
21st-century Indian women singers